Vangaichungpao railway station is a newly commissioned railway station in Tamenglong district, Manipur. Its code is VNGP. It serve Vangaichunpao a village present in west Tamenglong sub-division of Tamenglong District. The station consists of two platforms. This station is directly connected to Agartala, Silchar and other parts of Manipur.

References

Railway stations in Imphal East district
Lumding railway division
Proposed railway stations in India